In enzymology, a procollagen-proline 3-dioxygenase is an enzyme that catalyzes the chemical reaction

procollagen L-proline + 2-oxoglutarate + O2  procollagen trans-3-hydroxy-L-proline + succinate + CO2

The enzyme is a member of the alpha-ketoglutarate-dependent hydroxylases superfamily. The 3 substrates of this enzyme are procollagen L-proline, 2-oxoglutarate, and O2, whereas its 3 products are procollagen trans-3-hydroxy-L-proline, succinate, and CO2.

This enzyme belongs to the family of oxidoreductases, specifically those acting on paired donors, with O2 as oxidant and incorporation or reduction of oxygen. The oxygen incorporated need not be derived from O2 with 2-oxoglutarate as one donor, and incorporation of one atom o oxygen into each donor.  The systematic name of this enzyme class is procollagen-L-proline,2-oxoglutarate:oxygen oxidoreductase (3-hydroxylating). Other names in common use include proline,2-oxoglutarate 3-dioxygenase, prolyl 3-hydroxylase, protocollagen proline 3-hydroxylase, prolyl-4-hydroxyprolyl-glycyl-peptide, 2-oxoglutarate: oxygen, and oxidoreductase, 3-hydroxylating.  It has 2 cofactors: iron,  and Ascorbate.

References

 
 

Human 2OG oxygenases
EC 1.14.11
Iron enzymes
Ascorbate enzymes
Enzymes of unknown structure